The Ecleftic: 2 Sides II a Book is the second studio album released by Haitian hip hop musician Wyclef Jean. The album was supported by its singles "It Doesn't Matter", "911" and "Perfect Gentleman". At the 43rd Grammy Awards his duet with Mary J. Blige, "911" earned him a nomination for Grammy Award for Best R&B Performance by a Duo or Group with Vocals in 2001. The album debuted at number nine on the US Billboard 200 chart. It was certified platinum by the Recording Industry Association of America (RIAA).

Music
The album features a guest appearance from Kenny Rogers, contributing a variation of the chorus from his 1978 number-one hit "The Gambler." Track 14 "However You Want It" is a response to Canibus for the remarks he made about him on his album 2000 B.C. (Before Can-I-Bus). Track 18, "Bus Search", is a spoken-word mini drama, in which Jean's tour bus is stopped by two Police officers, one of whom threatens to make them empty the bus' contents unless they play him something by Pink Floyd. The following track is a cover of the latter's  "Wish You Were Here", overlaid with Jean rapping about the band.

Commercial performance
The Ecleftic: 2 Sides II a Book debuted at number nine on the US Billboard 200 selling 95,400 copies in its first week. The album also peaked at number three on the US Top R&B/Hip-Hop Albums chart. On August 31, 2001, the album was certified platinum by the Recording Industry Association of America (RIAA) for sales of over a million copies in the United States.

In the UK, the album peaked at number five on the UK Albums Chart and was certified Silver by the British Phonographic Industry (BPI) for denoting sales of 60,000 copies in the United Kingdom.

Track listing

Charts

Weekly charts

Year-end charts

Certifications

References

2000 albums
Concept albums
Wyclef Jean albums
Albums produced by Wyclef Jean
Albums produced by Jerry Duplessis